Nelson Mandela Children's Hospital in Johannesburg, South Africa, named after Nelson Mandela is a children's hospital constructed since 2014 and opened in 2017.

References

Hospitals in Johannesburg
University of the Witwatersrand
Teaching hospitals in South Africa
Children's hospitals in South Africa